Miami University Dolibois European Center (sometimes called the Miami University John E. Dolibois European Center or simply MUDEC) is an overseas campus of Miami University based in Differdange, Luxembourg. Located in the southwestern part of the country, it houses around 125 students each semester from Miami and other American universities. The center is named after John E. Dolibois, a native Luxembourger, who was a Miami University graduate and administrator as well as the United States Ambassador to Luxembourg from 1981 to 1985. The center, founded in 1968, is housed in Differdange Castle.

History
Charles Ray Wilson, university provost, conceived the project of an international campus in the 1960s. Sites for the campus were initially considered in Austria, France, Japan, Luxembourg, and Switzerland. An exploratory group appointed by university president Phillip Shriver visited potential sites in Europe along the line of French and German cultural and linguistic transition, which included university faculty and administrators. John E. Dolibois, at the time Vice President for Development and Alumni Affairs, was the first to suggest his native Luxembourg and was instrumental in establishing the campus, which took his name in 1988 for his efforts. The campus first opened in 1968 as the Miami University European Center in Luxembourg City.

In 1997, MUDEC moved to southern Luxembourg with the purchase of Differdange Castle in Differdange. The campus reached the milestone of 10,000 students enrolled in the program in 2012.

Academics
MUDEC offers continuing classes pertaining to students' studies at the main Miami University campus, typically in architecture, business, French, German, history, and political science. Apart from language courses, all courses are taught in English. Students live in homestays with Luxembourgish host families, and are encouraged to travel throughout Europe over weekends as well as through university-led study programs.

See also
 Sacred Heart University Luxembourg

References

External links
 

Miami University
Organisations based in Differdange
Universities and colleges in Luxembourg
Educational institutions established in 1968
Educational institutions in Luxembourg